Ntate Daniel Kgwadi (born 1967) is the vice-chancellor of Vaal University of Technology and is the former vice-chancellor and previous rector of the North-West University in South Africa now

Early life 

Kgwadi was born in Kraaipan, Western Transvaal,  South Africa. He matriculated at Kebalepile High School, Mafikeng. He obtained degrees: a BSc from the University of Bophuthatswana, an MSc in Chemistry from Ball State University, an MPhil from University of the North in South Africa, and a PhD  in Teacher Education from Potchefstroom University for Christian Higher Education in South Africa. He married Mable Kgwadi.

He taught at Phatsima High School.

Career 
In 2004 with the start of North-West University, he was appointed rector at the Mafikeng campus of the university. He occupied this position until 2014.

Vice–chancellor

In 2014 the then vice-chancellor Theuns Eloff resigned after a video surfaced showing first year students doing a Hitler salute, although an investigation showed no racial intent. Eloff resigned as a sign of goodwill. Kgwadi was appointed as Vice-Chancellor of the university with effect on 1 April 2014. Kgwadi was the first black, non-Afrikaans speaking vice-chancellor. He is based at the head office in Potchefstroom.

When Kgwadi assumed the vice-chancellor's office, Afrikaans was the language spoken by more than 50% of the students. Interpreter programmes (in class) were organized by the university. Students had the option to write exams in English or Afrikaans. Kgwadi's plan was to have no dominant language.

In April 2018 he had a heart attack, but survived it and continued to serve.

On the 7th of November 2021 he submitted a letter of resignation to the North-West University stating that he will be leaving the institution to continue his in the Vaal University of Technology. Prof Kgwadi will still serve as the Vice-Chancellor of North-West University until the 31st of January 2022 as required by the employment contract .

Honoris Causa

A Honoris Causa PhD was awarded to him by the Hanseo University in Seosan,  South Korea in 2010

References 

1967 births
Living people
North-West University alumni
Ball State University alumni
Vice-Chancellors of North-West University